Hermeville is a commune in the Seine-Maritime department in the Normandy region in northern France.

Geography

Heraldry

Population

Places of interest

 The chapel of St.Pierre, dating from the seventeenth century.
 The sixteenth-century stone cross in the cemetery.

See also
Communes of the Seine-Maritime department

References

External links

Hermeville on the Quid website 

Communes of Seine-Maritime